Goodyera yunnanensis is a species of orchid endemic to southern China.

Flowers are white or pale green, borne in a terminal raceme.

References

yunnanensis
Endemic orchids of China
Orchids of Yunnan
Orchids of Sichuan